Sir Arnold Charles Trinder, GBE (12 May 1906 – 25 December 1989) was a British businessman who was the Lord Mayor of London from 1968 to 1969.

References 

Who Was Who

External links 

 

1906 births
1989 deaths
Knights Bachelor
British businesspeople
20th-century lord mayors of London
Knights Grand Cross of the Order of the British Empire
Aldermen of the City of London
Sheriffs of the City of London
People educated at Wellington College, Berkshire
Alumni of Clare College, Cambridge
British businesspeople in shipping